Don Giovanni in Sicilia is a novel by Vitaliano Brancati, published in 1941.

The main character of the novel, Giovanni Percolla, is used to depict the scenario of male sexual conceit (in Italian: gallismo) characterising Sicily in the late 1930s.

In 1967, director Alberto Lattuada adapted the novel into a film of the same name.

References

External links
 

1941 novels
Italian novels adapted into films